Live at Brooklyn Academy of Music is a live album by the jazz group the World Saxophone Quartet released on the Italian Black Saint label.

The album features live performances by Hamiet Bluiett, Julius Hemphill, Oliver Lake and David Murray recorded at the Brooklyn Academy of Music in New York City on December 6–7, 1985.

Reception

The AllMusic review by Scott Yanow awarded the album 4 stars, stating, "Of their six originals, it is as usual the three Hemphill contributions that are most memorable."

Martin Johnson of New York Magazine included the album in his list "The New York Canon: Jazz," writing "Soulful pop energy and avant-garde elusiveness prefiguring the late-eighties–early-nineties Knitting Factory scene."

A reviewer for Billboard wrote that the album "finds Messrs. Bluiett, Hemphill, Lake, and Murray waxing bluesy, swinging, and cacophonous."

Track listing
 "One/Waltz/Time" (Hemphill) - 3:51  
 "Great Peace" (Murray) - 14:58  
 "Kinda' Up" (Lake) - 3:50  
 "Paper Works" (Bluiett) - 8:07  
 "Open Air (For Tommy)" (Hemphill) - 10:14  
 "Georgia Blue" (Hemphill) - 6:35

Personnel
Hamiet Bluiett — baritone saxophone
Julius Hemphill — alto saxophone
Oliver Lake — alto saxophone
David Murray — tenor saxophone

References 

World Saxophone Quartet live albums
1986 live albums
Black Saint/Soul Note live albums